Network manager may refer to:
 Network administrator, profession
NetworkManager, software utility for Linux and other Unix-like operating systems